Ramchandra Sapre (1915–1999) was an Indian chess player and first winner of the Indian Chess Championship.

References 

1915 births
1999 deaths
Indian chess players
Marathi people
20th-century chess players
Chess in India